Martins Creek is a  tributary of Tunkhannock Creek in northeastern Pennsylvania in the United States.

Martins Creek begins just west of New Milford and flows south to the Tunkhannock at Nicholson. It flows through a deep, narrow valley and is paralleled by U.S. Route 11 for its entire length.

Martins Creek has three named tributaries: Hop Bottom Creek, Dry Creek, and East Branch Martins Creek.

See also
Horton Creek (Tunkhannock Creek), next tributary of Tunkhannock Creek going downstream
Utley Brook, next tributary of Tunkhannock Creek going upstream
List of rivers of Pennsylvania

References

Rivers of Pennsylvania
Tributaries of Tunkhannock Creek
Rivers of Susquehanna County, Pennsylvania
Rivers of Wyoming County, Pennsylvania